The 2006 Premier League speedway season was the second division of speedway in the United Kingdom and governed by the Speedway Control Bureau (SCB), in conjunction with the British Speedway Promoters' Association (BSPA).

Season summary
The League consisted of 14 teams for the 2005 season after the Reading Racers elected to compete in the Elite League and the closure of the Exeter Falcons and the Hull Vikings. The Mildenhall Fen Tigers elected to enter the Premier League along with the newly founded Redcar Bears.

King's Lynn Stars won the league title.

Final table

Play-offs
Aggregate scores over two legs.

Quarter-finals
King's Lynn Stars 110-75 Redcar Bears
Sheffield Tigers 97-86 Workington Comets
Isle of Wight Islanders 97-91 Glasgow Tigers
Rye House Rockets 94-88 Somerset Rebels

Semi-finals
Sheffield Tigers 103-85 Isle of Wight Islanders
King's Lynn Stars 102-83 Rye House Rockets

Final
King's Lynn Stars 100-82 Sheffield Tigers

Premier League Knockout Cup
The 2006 Premier League Knockout Cup was the 39th edition of the Knockout Cup for tier two teams. King's Lynn Stars were the winners of the competition for the second successive year.

First round

Quarter-finals

Semi-finals

Final
First leg

Second leg

King's Lynn were declared Knockout Cup Champions, winning on aggregate 107–77.

Final leading averages

Riders & final averages
Berwick

Michal Makovský 8.06
Jacek Rempala 7.66
Adrian Rymel 7.14
Stanisław Burza 7.11
Lee Smethills 6.86
Andreas Bergstrom 6.65
Craig Branney 5.94
David Meldrum 4.28
Danny Warwick 3.36

Edinburgh

Theo Pijper 8.22
Matthew Wethers 7.56
William Lawson 7.42
Russell Harrison 7.41 
Henrik Møller 6.57
Derek Sneddon 6.19
Daniele Tessari 4.00
Sean Stoddart 2.90

Glasgow

Shane Parker 9.91 
Danny Bird 9.10 
Kauko Nieminen 7.96
Robert Ksiezak 5.72
James Cockle 4.82
David McAllan .4.56
Lee Dicken 3.91

Isle of Wight

Chris Holder 8.80 
Jason Doyle 7.57
Krzysztof Stojanowski 7.20
Jason Bunyan 6.92
Ray Morton 6.60
Krister Marsh 5.15
Chris Johnson 5.03
Nick Simmons 3.50

King's Lynn

Tomáš Topinka 9.80
Kevin Doolan 9.30
Daniel Nermark 9.07
Troy Batchelor 8.34
Trevor Harding 6.40
Chris Mills 6.07 
John Oliver 5.56
Simon Lambert 4.91 

Mildenhall

Jason Lyons 9.24
Danny King 8.40 
Jon Armstrong 6.78
Brent Werner 6.15
Shaun Tacey 5.91
Jason King 5.68
James Brundle 4.50
Jordan Frampton 3.48
Barry Burchatt 2.47

Newcastle

Josef Franc 8.34
George Štancl 8.21
James Grieves 7.76
Christian Henry 7.37
Jamie Robertson 4.93
Manuel Hauzinger 4.73
Adam McKinna 1.91

Newport

Craig Watson 8.44
Carl Wilkinson 6.99
Neil Collins 6.88
Chris Schramm 6.29 
Tony Atkin 6.08
Joel Parsons 5.59
Billy Legg 1.57
Sam Hurst 0.83

Redcar

Gary Havelock 10.10
Mathieu Trésarrieu 7.57
Tomáš Suchánek 6.35
Kevin Little 6.34
Daniel Giffard 6.03
Chris Kerr 5.20
Richard Juul 4.76
Jack Hargreaves 4.00

Rye House

Steve Boxall 8.80
Edward Kennett 8.73 
Chris Neath 8.38 
Tommy Allen 6.35
Luke Bowen 5.53
Ross Brady 5.40
Ben Powell 5.18
Lee Smethills 5.06
Adam Roynon 4.78
Jamie Courtney 4.31
Danny Betson 3.69

Sheffield

Andre Compton 9.94
Ricky Ashworth 8.59
Ben Wilson 8.11
Emiliano Sanchez 7.71
Kyle Legault 7.62 
Paul Cooper 4.39
Benji Compton 3.61

Somerset

Magnus Zetterström 10.52 
Emil Kramer 7.73
Glenn Cunningham 7.33
Paul Fry 7.20
Stephan Katt 6.67
Ben Barker 5.19
Glen Phillips 5.19
Simon Walker 5.03

Stoke

Mark Lemon 9.03
Paul Thorp 8.07
Robbie Kessler 7.80
Paul Clews 6.45
Alan Mogridge 6.21
Trent Leverington 5.08
Barrie Evans 4.58
Luke Priest 3.82

Workington

James Wright 8.58
Garry Stead 8.47
Rusty Harrison 8.07
Paul Thorp 7.60
Ritchie Hawkins 7.44
Tomasz Piszcz 7.37
Alan Mogridge 6.75
Aidan Collins 5.57
Lee Derbyshire 2.05
John Branney 1.85

See also
List of United Kingdom Speedway League Champions
Knockout Cup (speedway)

References

Speedway Premier League
2006 in speedway
2006 in British motorsport